The Raging Tide is a 1951 American film noir and crime film  directed by George Sherman and starring Shelley Winters, Richard Conte, Stephen McNally, Charles Bickford and Alex Nicol. The screenplay was by Ernest K. Gann based on his 1950 novel Fiddler's Green.

Plot
The film tells of Bruno Felkin (Conte) as a San Francisco crime boss. After he kills off a mob rival, he tries to arrange an alibi with his girlfriend, Connie Thatcher (Winters). However, she isn't available, which forces Felkin to hide out on a fishing boat owned by Hamil Linder (Bickford) until Connie shows.

Far from the perfect guest, Felkin tries to motivate Linder's son Carl (Alex Nicol) into doing his dirty work until the police are off his trail. Gradually, however, Felkin, and Connie, become reformed by the decency and humanity of the Linder family.

Cop Kelsey (Stephen McNally) continues to pursue Felkin and might not see things in this new light.

Cast
 Shelley Winters as Connie Thatcher
 Richard Conte as Bruno Felkin
 Stephen McNally as Lt. Kelsey
 Charles Bickford as Hamil Linder
 Alex Nicol as Carl Linder
 John McIntire as Corky Mullins
 Tito Vuolo as Barney Schriona
 Chubby Johnson as "General" Ball
 Minerva Urecal as Johnnie Mae Swanson

See also
 List of American films of 1951

References

External links
 
 
 

1951 films
1951 crime drama films
American black-and-white films
1950s English-language films
Film noir
Films based on American novels
Films directed by George Sherman
Universal Pictures films
American crime drama films
Seafaring films
Films scored by Frank Skinner
1950s American films